KSOS is a non-commercial radio station located in Las Vegas, Nevada, broadcasting on 90.5 FM. KSOS airs a Christian contemporary music format.

History
KILA 95.5 FM was founded by Jack French and signed on the air in 1972. KILA became Las Vegas' first Contemporary Christian music station. KILA switched frequencies in 1985 from 95.5 FM to 90.5 FM.

KILA became the flagship station the SOS radio network in the 1980s. KILA became KSOS in 2005.

KSOS also airs its programming on a station in Utah, known as KANN, from Roy, Utah.

KSOS also broadcasts in Kingman, Arizona at 103.1 FM.

References

External links

SOS
Contemporary Christian radio stations in the United States
Radio stations established in 1972
1972 establishments in Nevada
SOS